Malditas Canciones is Coti Sorokin's fifth solo album. It earned a Latin Grammy Award nomination for Best Male Pop Vocal Album. Its lead single "Nunca Tendré" peaked at #29 on the Billboard Latin Pop Airplay.

Track listing
"Malditas canciones"
"Ya pasó"
"Nunca tendré"
"Perdóname"
"Jugando con vos"
"Tanta magia"
"Frank Sinatra"
"Comer tu boca"
"El verdadero Rock and Roll"
"Aquí y Ahora"

References

2009 albums
Coti albums